The Naziresha Mosque is a Cultural Monument of Albania, located in Elbasan. It was built in 1599 by a Naziresha (Nazire), the daughter of a Nazır (minister). After being partly damaged in 1920 due to an earthquake (its minaret balcony and part of its typical Albanian roof was destroyed), it became a Cultural Monument in 1948.

During a renovation in 2012, the high red tile roof was replaced by a metal dome.

References 

Cultural Monuments of Albania
Buildings and structures in Elbasan
Mosques in Albania
Rebuilt buildings and structures
Tourist attractions in Elbasan County
Mosques completed in 1599
1599 establishments in the Ottoman Empire